The Lower Morava Valley is a geomorphological formation (special type of valley) in the Czech Republic and Slovakia. It is formed by the depression in the Western Carpathians (Ždánice Forest, Kyjov Hills and Mikulov Hills) in the west and Bílé Karpaty and Chvojnice Hills in the east. The drainage to the Morava River of the Danube basin runs finally to the Black Sea.

It includes low watershed Dyje-Morava in Lanžhot.

Geography
The Lower Morava Valley is a nordest part of Vienna Basin (Western Carpathians) and the corridor to Napajedla Gate, Upper Morava Valley, Moravian Gate and later in final goal North European Plain (Poland- Lower Silesia – Galicia) since ancient times. Here ran one arm of the most important trade routes from southern Europe to the Baltic Sea (e.g. the Amber Road – eastern branch) and also routes from Moravia to Upper Silesia and Lesser Poland. The Emperor Ferdinand Northern Railway (one part) built in 1840–41 from Břeclav (Vienna) to Přerov also traversed the Lower Morava Valley.

The Morava and Thaya rivers, Myjava (river), Chvojnice, Trkmanka, Kyjovka as well among others, finishing here in theirs floodplains.

The largest towns in Lower Morava Valley are Břeclav, Hodonín, Uherské Hradiště, Staré Město, Dubňany, and Strážnice.

Soil horizon – mainly sand, fluvisol and loess, partly chernozem.

Gallery

See also
Vyškov Gate
Outer Subcarpathia
South-Moravian Carpathians
Upper Morava Valley
Dyje–Svratka Valley

References

Further reading
(1993) Geografický místopisný slovník, Academia, Praha. 
(1997) Plašienka, D., Grecula, P., Putiš, M., Kováč, M. a Hovorka, D.,: Evolution and structure of the Western Carpathians: an overview. Mineralia Slovaca – Monograph, Košice, p. 1–24.

Valleys of the Czech Republic
Western Carpathians
Moravia